The 2008 Uniform California Earthquake Rupture Forecast, Version 2, or UCERF2, is one of a series of earthquake forecasts prepared for the state California by the Working Group on California Earthquake Probabilities (WGCEP), collaboration of the U.S. Geological Survey, the California Geological Survey, and the Southern California Earthquake Center, with funding from the California Earthquake Authority. UCERF2 was superseded by UCERF3 in 2015.

Of the hundreds of seismogenic (earthquake causing) geologic faults in California, UCERF classifies only six faults as Type A sources, meaning there is sufficient information to both estimate and model the probability of a Magnitude (M) 6.7 or greater earthquake within 30 years. These six faults (summarized in Table A, below) are the: (1) San Andreas (split into northern and southern sections, (2) San Jacinto, (3) Elsinore, (4) Garlock, (5) Calaveras, and (6) Hayward-Rodgers Creek.  Faults which are known to be slipping (and therefore seismogenic) but lack sufficient information to fully model how close they might be to rupture are classified as Type B.  About twenty of these faults (see Table B) are estimated to have a 5% or greater chance of an M ≥ 6.7 earthquake within 30 years. An additional six areas where strain is accumulating but where knowledge is insufficient to apportion slip onto specific faults are classified as Type C sources.

There is additional chance of earthquakes on faults that were not modeled, and of lesser earthquakes. Northern California has an estimated 12% chance over the same 30 years of an M ≥ 8 megathrust earthquake on the Cascadia subduction zone.  UCERF has also prepared "participation probability maps"  of the chance that any area will experience an earthquake above a certain magnitude from any source in the next 30 years (see figure).

Methodology 
UCERF probabilities of an earthquake on a given fault are based on four layers of modeling:
 A fault model of the fault's physical geometry.
 A deformation model of slip rates and related factors for each fault section.
 An earthquake rate model of the region.
 A probability model for estimating probability of an earthquake during a specified interval.

These are used to produce both time-independent and time-dependent forecasts of earthquake probabilities.  The former are based on "stress-renewal" models of seismic stress being released by an earthquake, then renewing (or rebounding; see Elastic-rebound theory) until it triggers another earthquake. In time-dependent models the probability of a fault rupturing thus depends on how long stress has been accumulating since the last rupture. However, the details of how this happens are not adequately known, so time-dependent methods estimate the periodicity and currently accumulated strain based on observed seismicity.  Out of this a time-independent earthquake rate model (ERM) is produced, from which the time-dependent probability model (UCERF) is derived. (For more information see "Can earthquakes be predicted?" in the External links.)

The concept of stress-renewal has been criticized, and may even be invalid,

Table A 
These are the six geologic faults in California with sufficient data to use a stress-renewal model for estimating the probability of an M ≥ 6.7 earthquake within the next 30 years.  The Hayward fault zone and Rodgers Creek fault are treated as a single fault; the San Andreas fault is treated as two sections.  A complete listing of known Quaternary faults can be found at the U.S. Geological Survey's Quaternary Fault and Fold Database (QFFDB). Earthquake probabilities and other details from The Uniform California Earthquake Rupture Forecast, Version 2 (UCERF 2).

Notes for Table A.
 1. Fault numbers and maps from USGS Quaternary Fault and Fold Database.
 2. Lengths from UCERF-2, Table 4; may vary from QFFDB values.
 3. Strikes (orientation) from QDFFB.
 4. Slip rates from UCERF-2 Table 4; range reflects different sections.
 5. Estimated probability of a M≥6.7 event in 30 years. From UCERF-2 Table 12.

Table B 

Approximately twenty geologic faults in California are of "Type B" status, where the probability of an earthquake of M ≥ 6.7 in the next 30 years is estimated to be greater than 5%, but the data is insufficient for stress-renewal modeling.  (Not to be confused with the USGS QFFDB class B category of faults of unknown or minor seismicity.)

Notes for Table B.
 1. List of faults from UCERF-2, Table 13.  Unless otherwise noted other details are from Appendix A, Table 1.
 2. Fault numbers and maps from USGS Quaternary Fault and Fold Database. Some faults lack a QFFDB entry. 
 5. Estimated probability of a M≥6.7 event in 30 years. From UCERF-2 Table 13.

See also 
California Earthquake Prediction Evaluation Council
Cascadia subduction zone
Earthquake prediction
Elastic-rebound theory
San Andreas Fault
Southern California faults
Walker Lane

Notes

References 
.
.
.
.
.
. Also published as California Geological Survey Special Report 203.

External links 
Forecasting California's Earthquakes—What Can We Expect in the Next 30 Years? Explains UCERF.
Working Group on California Earthquake Probabilities (WGCEP)
U.S. Geological Survey
California Geological Survey
Southern California Earthquake Center
Earthquake Frequently Asked Questions (USGS)
Can you predict earthquakes (USGS FAQ)
Can earthquakes be predicted? A good explanation.
Recent earthquakes in California and elsewhere (SCEC)
Recent earthquakes in the U.S. and the world (USGS)
Fault Activity Map (CGS)
National Seismic Hazard Maps and related resources (USGS)

Geology of California
Seismic faults of California